The National Gallery of Slovenia is the national art gallery of Slovenia. It is located in the capital Ljubljana. It was founded in 1918, after the dissolution of Austria-Hungary and the establishment of the State of Slovenes, Croats and Serbs. Initially, it was hosted in the Kresija Palace of Ljubljana, but moved to the present location in 1925.

The building 

The present building was built in 1896, during the administration of Mayor Ivan Hribar, whose ambition was to transform Ljubljana into a representative capital of all the Slovene Lands. It was designed by the Czech architect František Škabrout and was first used as a Slovenian cultural center (Narodni dom) as the central seat of various cultural associations of national importance. The building stands near Tivoli Park and was completely renovated in 2013-2016.

In the early 1990s, an extension to the main building was built by the Slovene architect Edvard Ravnikar. In 2001, a large transparent glass gallery, designed by the Sadar + Vuga architecture bureau, was built to connect the two wings of the building.

The exhibits 
The gallery hosts a permanent art collection from the Middle Ages to the early 20th century. The original of the Baroque Robba fountain can also be seen in the central glass gallery of the building, where it was moved after extensive restoration in 2008.

The notable Slovene and European artists whose works are exhibited in the gallery include:

Anton Ažbe
Giovanni Baglione
Franc Berneker
Renato Birolli
Massimo Campigli
Giovanni Andrea Carlone
Anton Čebej
Lojze Dolinar
Frans Francken II
Friedrich Gauermann
Ivan Grohar
Alojz Gangl
Rihard Jakopič
Matija Jama
Abraham Janssens
Alexej von Jawlensky
Jacob Jordaens
Jean Jouvenet
Ivana Kobilca
Matevž Langus
Filipp Malyavin
Jožef Petkovšek
Jacob Pynas
Gerard Seghers
Matej Sternen
Janez Šubic
Jurij Šubic
Jožef Tominc
Ivan Vavpotič
Élisabeth-Louise Vigée-Le Brun
Cornelis de Wael
Ivan Zajec
Petar Dobrović

See also
Art of Slovenia
List of national galleries
Museum of Modern Art (Ljubljana)

References

External links

Official website

Buildings and structures in Ljubljana
Art museums and galleries in Ljubljana
Cultural infrastructure completed in 1896
Art museums established in 1918
Gallery
1918 establishments in Slovenia
Slovenia